The Moroccan Union for Democracy is a political party in Morocco.

In the parliamentary election, held on 7 September 2007, the party won 2 out of 325 seats.

Political parties in Morocco